Hana Nasser (born 27 March 1991) is an Arab-Israeli professional association football player.

Biography

Playing career 
Nassar made his professional debut, coming on as a substitute for Alon Harazi, in a 0–0 Toto Cup draw against Hapoel Be'er Sheva on 11 November 2009.

International career 
Nasser represented Israel at the 2009 Maccabiah Games, winning a bronze medal.

Statistics

References

Footnotes 

1991 births
Living people
Israeli footballers
Israeli Christians
Arab-Israeli footballers
Maccabi Haifa F.C. players
Hapoel Acre F.C. players
Maccabi Ironi Bat Yam F.C. players
Maccabi Umm al-Fahm F.C. players
Hakoah Maccabi Amidar Ramat Gan F.C. players
Hapoel Bnei Lod F.C. players
F.C. Tzeirei Kafr Kanna players
Maccabi Daliyat al-Karmel F.C. players
Maccabi Bnei Reineh F.C. players
Israeli Premier League players
Liga Leumit players
Footballers from Northern District (Israel)
Maccabiah Games medalists in football
Maccabiah Games bronze medalists for Israel
Competitors at the 2009 Maccabiah Games
Association football defenders